SASI (Schools Administrative Student Information) or SASI Student Information System was a computer program developed by Jerry D. Lloyd of Educational Timesharing Systems, who was acquired by National Computer Systems (NCS) and NCS was acquired by Pearson in 1997. The cross-platform system provides administrators and educators with  access to student demographics, attendance, schedules, discipline, grades, extended test histories, and state reporting codes. Features of SASI include SASIxp, InteGrade Pro, classroomXP, and Parent Access. In 2003, more than 16,000 schools nationwide used the software.

It was classified as end of life in 2011 by Pearson.

External links
 Official website

References

School-administration software